Apostolos Pavlos (meaning Paul the Apostle) is a former municipality in Imathia, Greece. Since the 2011 local government reform it is part of the municipality Veroia, of which it is a municipal unit. The municipal unit has an area of 64.252 km2. Population 8,818 (2011). The seat of the municipality was in Makrochori.

References

Populated places in Imathia

bg:Апостол Павел (дем)
el:Δήμος Αποστόλου Παύλου